Croftinloan Preparatory School was a co-educational private preparatory school near Pitlochry, Scotland.

History
Croftinloan School was established in 1936 by Hugo Brown as a boys prep school. Hugo Brown bought the residential and sporting estate of Croftinloan in 1935 from Mr J Paterson Brown, who used Croftinloan House as a shooting lodge. The estate was originally owned by members of the Atholl-Fergusson family.

In April 2000, the Governors announced that the school would be closing in June.

In 2013, Croftinloan House was demolished to make way for a housing development.

Notable alumni
Patrick Hodge, Lord Hodge (born 1953), Justice of the Supreme Court of the United Kingdom.
David Urquhart (born 1952), Bishop of Birmingham.

References

Educational institutions established in 1936
Defunct schools in Perth and Kinross
Defunct private schools in Scotland
Defunct preparatory schools in Scotland
Defunct boarding schools in Scotland
1936 establishments in Scotland
2000 disestablishments in Scotland
Educational institutions disestablished in 2000
Buildings and structures in Pitlochry